Fredson Marcelo Andrade Rodrigues (born 31 January 1988 in São Vicente), known simply as Fredson, is a Cape Verdean footballer who plays for Académica do Mindelo as a midfielder.

External links

1988 births
Living people
People from São Vicente, Cape Verde
Cape Verdean footballers
Association football midfielders
Liga Portugal 2 players
Segunda Divisão players
Varzim S.C. players
FC Pampilhosa players
Batuque FC players
CS Mindelense players
Académica do Mindelo players
Cape Verdean expatriate footballers
Expatriate footballers in Portugal
Cape Verdean expatriate sportspeople in Portugal